Dobrivoje Marković (born 22 April 1986) is a Serbian handball player for Hercegovac Gajdobra.

Club career
After starting out at Jugović, Marković moved to Spain and joined Cuenca in 2008. He also played abroad for Vardar and Zagreb, winning numerous trophies. In 2018, Marković returned to his homeland and signed with Železničar 1949.

International career

Youth
At youth level, Marković was a regular member of the Serbia and Montenegro winning squad at the 2004 European Under-18 Championship. He also helped the nation win the gold medal at the 2005 World Under-19 Championship.

Senior
A full Serbia international since its inception, Marković was a member of the team that won the silver medal at the 2012 European Championship. He also participated in the 2012 Summer Olympics.

Honours
Vardar
 Macedonian Handball Super League: 2012–13, 2014–15
 Macedonian Handball Cup: 2011–12, 2013–14, 2014–15
 SEHA League: 2011–12, 2013–14
Zagreb
 Croatian Handball Premier League: 2015–16, 2016–17, 2017–18
 Croatian Handball Cup: 2015–16, 2016–17, 2017–18

References

External links

 Olympic record
 
 

1986 births
Living people
People from Teslić
Serbs of Bosnia and Herzegovina
Serbian male handball players
Competitors at the 2009 Mediterranean Games
Mediterranean Games medalists in handball
Mediterranean Games gold medalists for Serbia
Olympic handball players of Serbia
Handball players at the 2012 Summer Olympics
RK Jugović players
RK Vardar players
RK Zagreb players
Liga ASOBAL players
Expatriate handball players
Serbian expatriate sportspeople in Spain
Serbian expatriate sportspeople in North Macedonia
Serbian expatriate sportspeople in Croatia